The Volvo LV80/90-series was a medium size truck produced by Swedish automaker Volvo between 1935 and 1940.

History
Volvo presented a new medium-sized truck in 1935. The truck was available in two versions: the smaller LV80-series, with a side-valve engine and the larger LV90-series, with an overhead valve engine. On this generation of trucks the engine and cab was moved forward so that the engine was mounted above the front axle, not behind as before. This gives a better load distribution between the front and rear axle, resulting in reduced rear axle load.

After a year the older DC engine of the LV90-series was replaced by the bigger FC engine. Both engines were offered in Hesselman version.

Engines

Gallery

References

External links 

 Volvo Trucks Global - history
 Swedish brass cars - picture gallery

LV81
Vehicles introduced in 1935